Ćwikła may refer to:

 Red chrain, or beet-and-horseradish relish, also known in Polish as ćwikła z chrzanem
 Ryszard Ćwikła (1946–1992), Polish alpine skier